Olga Vasdeki (born 26 September 1973 in Volos) is a Greek triple jumper.

She was the most successful Greek triple jumper and Greek record holder until 1998, when she won the gold medal at the European Championships in Budapest, being at the time just the second female Greek athlete to be crowned European Champion after Anna Verouli in 1982. The following year she won the bronze medal at the World Championships in Seville behind Paraskevi Tsiamita and Yamile Aldama. She is the younger sister of long jumper Spyridon Vasdekis.

Achievements

References 
 

1973 births
Living people
Athletes from Volos
Greek female triple jumpers
Athletes (track and field) at the 1996 Summer Olympics
Athletes (track and field) at the 2000 Summer Olympics
Athletes (track and field) at the 2004 Summer Olympics
Olympic athletes of Greece
World Athletics Championships medalists
Greek European Athletics champions (track and field)
Mediterranean Games gold medalists for Greece
Mediterranean Games medalists in athletics
Athletes (track and field) at the 1997 Mediterranean Games